Wronki railway station is a railway station serving the town of Wronki, in the Greater Poland Voivodeship, Poland. The station opened in 1848 and is located on the Poznań–Szczecin railway. The train services are operated by PKP and Przewozy Regionalne.

The station building dates from 1880 and has been a registered monument since 2002.

Modernisation

In 2012 and 2013 2.6 million zł was spent on modernising the station, making it accessible for less able people. The modernised station was opened in November 2013.

Train services
The station is served by the following services:

Intercity services Swinoujscie - Szczecin - Stargard - Krzyz - Poznan - Kutno - Warsaw - Bialystok / Lublin - Rzeszow - Przemysl
Intercity services Swinoujscie - Szczecin - Stargard - Krzyz - Poznan - Leszno - Wroclaw - Opole - Katowice - Krakow - Rzeszow - Przemysl
Intercity services Szczecin - Stargard - Krzyz - Poznan - Kutno - Lowicz - Lodz - Krakow
Intercity services Gorzow Wielkopolskie - Krzyz - Poznan - Ostrow Wielkopolski - Lubliniec - Czestochowa - Krakow
Regional services (R) Szczecin - Stargard - Dobiegniew - Krzyz - Wronki - Poznan

References

 This article is based upon a translation of the Polish language version as of October 2016.

External links

Railway stations in Poland opened in 1848
Railway stations in Greater Poland Voivodeship
Szamotuły County
19th-century establishments in the Province of Posen